Lost (Spanish: Perdida) is a 1950 Mexican drama film directed by Fernando A. Rivero and starring Ninón Sevilla, Agustín Lara and Domingo Soler.

The film's art direction was by José Rodríguez Granada.

Cast
 Ninón Sevilla as Rosario Gómez / Norma  
 Agustín Lara as Agustín 
 Domingo Soler as Don Pascual  
 Florencio Castelló as Matias  
 César del Campo as Armando  
 Maruja Grifell as La Turca  
 Miguel Manzano as Sobrino Turca  
 Jorge Mondragón as Comandante 
 Guillermo Bravo Sosa as Padrastro  
 Amalia Cristerna 
 Linda Rey 
 Antonio Velázquez as Antonio 
 Victorio Blanco as Espectador toros  
 Lupe Carriles as Raymunda, ama de llaves 
 Roberto Cobo
 Roberto Morales
 Luis Mussot as Escritor  
 José Muñoz as Licenciado 
 Dámaso Pérez Prado
 Matilde Sánchez as Cantante  
 Pedro Vargas as Cantante

References

Bibliography 
 Andrew Grant Wood. Agustin Lara: A Cultural Biography. OUP USA, 2014.

External links 
 

1950 films
1950 drama films
Mexican drama films
1950s Spanish-language films
Films directed by Fernando A. Rivero
Mexican black-and-white films
1950s Mexican films